Windows Server 2008 R2, codenamed "Windows Server 7", is the fifth version of the Windows Server operating system produced by Microsoft and released as part of the Windows NT family of operating systems. It was released to manufacturing on July 22, 2009, and became generally available on October 22, 2009, shortly after the completion of Windows 7. It is the successor to Windows Server 2008, which is derived from the Windows Vista codebase, released the previous year, and was succeeded by the Windows 8-based Windows Server 2012.

Enhancements in Windows Server 2008 R2 include new functionality for Active Directory, new virtualization and management features, version 7.5 of the Internet Information Services web server and support for up to 256 logical processors. It is built on the same kernel used with the client-oriented Windows 7, and is the first server operating system released by Microsoft not to support 32-bit processors, a move which was followed by the consumer-oriented Windows 11 in 2021. 

Windows Server 2008 R2 is the final version of Windows Server that supports IA-64 and processors without PAE, SSE2 and NX (although a 2018 update dropped support for non-SSE2 processors). It's successor, Windows Server 2012, requires a processor with PAE, SSE2 and NX in any supported architecture.

Seven editions of Windows Server 2008 R2 were released: Foundation, Standard, Enterprise, Datacenter, Web, HPC Server and Itanium, as well as Windows Storage Server 2008 R2. A home server variant called Windows Home Server 2011 was also released.

History 
Microsoft introduced Windows Server 2008 R2 at the 2008 Professional Developers Conference as the server variant of Windows 7, based on the Windows NT kernel.

On January 7, 2009, a beta release of Windows Server 2008 R2 was made available to subscribers of Microsoft's TechNet and MSDN programs, as well as those participating in the Microsoft Connect program for Windows 7. Two days later, the beta was released to the public via the Microsoft Download Center.

On April 30, 2009, the release candidate was made available to subscribers of TechNet and MSDN. On May 5, 2009, the release candidate was made available to the public via the Microsoft download center.

According to Windows Server Blog, the following are the dates of the year 2009 when Microsoft Windows Server 2008 R2 has been made available to various distribution channels:

 OEMs received Windows Server 2008 R2 in English and all language packs on July 29. The remaining languages were available around August 11.
 Independent software vendor (ISV) and independent hardware vendor (IHV) partners have been able to download Windows Server 2008 R2 from MSDN starting on August 14.
 IT professionals with TechNet subscriptions were able to download Windows Server 2008 R2 and obtain product keys for English, French, German, Italian, and Spanish variants beginning August 14 and all remaining languages beginning August 21.
 Developers with MSDN subscriptions have been able to download and obtain product keys for Windows Server 2008 R2 in English, French, German, Italian, and Spanish starting August 14 and all remaining languages starting August 21.
 Microsoft Partner Program (MPP) gold/certified members were able to download Windows Server 2008 R2 through the MPP portal on August 19.
 Volume licensing customers with an existing Software Assurance (SA) contracts were able to download Windows Server 2008 R2 on August 19 via the Volume License Service Center.
 Volume licensing customers without an SA were able to purchase Windows Server 2008 R2 through volume licensing by September 1.

Additionally, qualifying students have been able to download Windows Server 2008 R2 Standard edition in 15 languages from the Microsoft Imagine program (known as DreamSpark at the time).

Microsoft has announced that Server 2008 R2 will be the last version of Windows supporting the Itanium architecture, with its extended support ending earlier than for x86-64 editions or "until July 10, 2018." However, monthly security updates continued until January 14, 2020, and a final unscheduled update appeared in May 2020 via WSUS.

New features 

A reviewer guide published by the company describes several areas of improvement in R2. These include new virtualization capabilities (Live Migration, Cluster Shared Volumes using Failover Clustering and Hyper-V), reduced power consumption, a new set of management tools and new Active Directory capabilities such as a "recycle bin" for deleted objects. IIS 7.5 has been added to this release which also includes updated FTP server services. Security enhancements include encrypted clientless authenticated VPN services through DirectAccess for clients using Windows 7, and the addition of DNSSEC support for DNS Server Service. Even though DNSSEC as such is supported, only one signature algorithm is available: #5/RSA/SHA-1. Since many zones use a different algorithm – including the root zone – this means that in reality Windows still can't serve as a recursive resolver.

The DHCP server supports a large number of enhancements such as MAC address-based control filtering, converting active leases into reservations or link layer based filters, DHCppP Name protection for non-Windows machines to prevent name squatting, better performance through aggressive lease database caching, DHCP activity logging, auto-population of certain network interface fields, a wizard for split-scope configuration, DHCP Server role migration using WSMT, support for DHCPv6 Option 15 (User Class) and Option 32 (Information Refresh Time). The DHCP server runs in the context of the Network Service account which has fewer privileges to reduce potential damage if compromised.

Windows Server 2008 R2 supports up to 64 physical processors or up to 256 logical processors per system. (Only the Datacenter and Itanium editions can take advantage of the capability of 64 physical processors. Enterprise, the next-highest edition after those two, can only use 8.) When deployed in a file server role, new File Classification Infrastructure services allow files to be stored on designated servers in the enterprise based on business naming conventions, relevance to business processes and overall corporate policies.

Server Core includes a subset of the .NET Framework, so that some applications (including ASP.NET web sites and Windows PowerShell 2.0) can be used.

Performance improvement was a major area of focus for this release; Microsoft has stated that work was done to decrease boot time, improve the efficiency of I/O operations while using less processing power, and generally improve the speed of storage devices, especially iSCSI.

Active Directory has several new features when raising the forest and domain functional levels to Windows Server 2008 R2: Two added features are Authentication Mechanism Assurance and Automatic SPN Management. When raising the forest functional level, the Active Directory recycle bin feature is available and can be enabled using the Active Directory Module for PowerShell.

Support lifecycle 
Support for the RTM version of Windows Server 2008 R2 ended on April 9, 2013. Users had to install Service Pack 1 to continue receiving updates.

On January 13, 2015, Windows Server 2008 R2 exited mainstream support and entered the extended support phase; Microsoft continued to provide security updates every month for Windows Server 2008 R2, however, free technical support, warranty claims, and design changes were no longer offered. Extended support ended on January 14, 2020, about ten years after the release of Windows Server 2008 R2. On July 12, 2018, Microsoft announced a paid "Extended Security Updates" service that will offer additional updates for Windows Server 2008 R2 Standard, Enterprise and Datacenter for up to 3 years after the end of extended support, lasting until January 10, 2023. In November 2021, Microsoft extended ESU support for Windows Server 2008 R2 until January 9, 2024, only for Microsoft Azure customers.

In August 2019, researchers reported that "all modern versions of Microsoft Windows" may be at risk for "critical" system compromise due to design flaws of hardware device drivers from multiple providers. In the same month, computer experts reported that the BlueKeep security vulnerability, that potentially affects older unpatched Microsoft Windows versions via the program's Remote Desktop Protocol, allowing for the possibility of remote code execution, may now include related flaws, collectively named DejaBlue, affecting newer Windows versions (i.e., Windows 7 and all recent versions) as well. In addition, experts reported a Microsoft security vulnerability, based on legacy code involving Microsoft CTF and ctfmon (ctfmon.exe), that affects all Windows versions from the older Windows XP version to the most recent Windows 10 versions; a patch to correct the flaw is currently available.

Service Pack 
On February 9, 2011, Microsoft officially released Service Pack 1 (SP1) for Windows 7 and Windows Server 2008 R2 to OEM partners. Apart from bug fixes, it introduces two new major functions, RemoteFX and Dynamic Memory. RemoteFX enables the use of graphics hardware support for 3D graphics in a Hyper-V based VM.  Dynamic Memory makes it possible for a VM to only allocate as much physical RAM as is needed temporarily for its execution. On February 16, SP1 became available for MSDN and TechNet subscribers as well as volume licensing customers. As of February 22, SP1 is generally available for download via the Microsoft Download Center and available on Windows Update.

System requirements 
System requirements for Windows Server 2008 R2 are as follows:

Processor
1.4 GHz x86-64 or Itanium 2 processor
Memory
Minimum: 512 MB RAM (may limit performance and some features)
Recommended: 2 GB RAM
Maximum: 8 GB RAM (Foundation), 32 GB RAM (Standard), or 2 TB RAM (Enterprise, Datacenter and Itanium)
Display
Super VGA (800×600) or higher
Disk Space Requirements
Minimum (editions higher than Foundation): 32 GB or more
Minimum (Foundation edition) 10 GB or more.
Computers with more than 16 GB of RAM require more disk space for paging and dump files.
Other
DVD drive, keyboard and mouse, Internet access (required for updates and online activation)

Editions

See also 
 BlueKeep (security vulnerability)
 Comparison of Microsoft Windows versions
 Comparison of operating systems
 History of Microsoft Windows
 List of operating systems
 Microsoft Servers

References

External links 
 Windows Server 2008 R2 on Microsoft TechNet
 
 Convert Windows Server 2008 R2 to Workstation

 
2009 software
X86-64 operating systems

es:Windows Server 2008#Windows Server 2008 R2
ms:Windows Server 2008#Windows Server 2008 R2
sv:Windows Server 2008#Windows Server 2008 R2